"Men on ..." (colloquially known as "Men on Film") is the umbrella title for a series of comedy sketches that appeared in episodes of the Fox sketch comedy series In Living Color. The sketch featured two gay cultural critics, Blaine Edwards (Damon Wayans) and Antoine Merriweather (David Alan Grier), commenting on aspects of popular culture, including movies, art and television.

"Men on ..." first appeared on the premiere episode of In Living Color and continued throughout Wayans's tenure on the series. The sketch was revived on the late-night comedy series Saturday Night Live when Wayans hosted.

"Men on ..." engendered controversy for its portrayal of black gay men. Both Blaine and Antoine were portrayed as extremely effeminate. Some LGBT people and organizations felt this portrayal was insulting to gay men, although response within the community was split. Cultural critics have identified "Men on ..." as having affected how African American men view homosexuality within their communities.

Format

The first installment of "Men on ...", "Men on Films", established the basic pattern for the sketch series. Over the strains of "It's Raining Men" by The Weather Girls, an announcer introduces the public access program "Men on Films". Hosts Blaine Edwards and Antoine Merriweather introduce themselves and explain that they will be discussing films of the day "from a male point of view".

They review Do the Right Thing, The Karate Kid Part III and Great Balls of Fire! and upcoming video releases for Black Widow, Miss Firecracker and Dangerous Liaisons. In each instance the film is reviewed with an extreme gay male interpretation regardless of any actual gay content or sensibility; in some cases, the review of the film is based solely on the film's name or the name of its stars. Do the Right Thing is praised for its supposed message of "Do the right thing, come on out the closet, don't be afraid to be who you is", whereas Karate Kid is panned for not exploring the possibility of a pederastic relationship between Mr. Miyagi and Daniel LaRusso.

Black Widow and Miss Firecracker, both of which feature women in the leading roles, are dismissed with a simple "Hated it!" Blaine initially praises Dangerous Liaisons for its courage in casting Glenn Close in a female role; Antoine informs Blaine that Close is actually a woman, prompting Blaine to exclaim "Clutch the pearls, what a sneaky thing to do!" The pair signify approval of a film by giving it "two snaps up!"

Subsequent sketches would explore other aspects of popular culture, including art, books and television. With each installment the sexual puns would become cruder and more abundant, the costumes would become more flamboyant and the "snaps up" (Men on Film) would become more and more elaborate. The variations included "two snaps, and a twist" (Men on Film), "two snaps, a twist and a kiss" (Men on Film), "two snaps in a circle" (Men on Art), "a rare Zorro snap, in Z formation" (Men on Books), "two snaps and your back field motion" (Men on Super Bowl), "two snaps, and wipe yo mouth" (the "Chef Boyardee" snap in Men on Cooking), "around the world snap, and back" (Men on Vacation), and a special snap for the "Men on Fitness" episode that was difficult to understand due to the actors laughing.

Inspiration
Speaking to NPR in 2012, Grier explained the inspiration for his characterization: "I had already done Dreamgirls on Broadway, and being in a musical and working with other performers who were gay, I was privy to that vocabulary backstage. They were being themselves. So a lot of it was hijacked from what I heard in the theater and what was permeating around. Now at that time, if a gay person was going to read you — to tell you off — it was always accompanied by snaps. Now I don't know if it was a gay thing, but it was also a very black thing."

Sketches
 "Men on Films" – April 15, 1990
 "Men on Art" – May 5, 1990
 "Men on Books" – May 26, 1990
 "Men on Films II" – September 23, 1990
 "Men on Vacation" – April 7, 1991
 "Men on Television" – May 12, 1991
 "Men on Film:  The Return" – September 29, 1991
 "Men on Film Festival" – November 24, 1991
 "Men on Football" – January 26, 1992
 "Men on European Vacation" - February 23, 1992
 "Men on Videotape Rentals" – March 29, 1992
 "Men on Cooking" – November 22, 1992
 "Men on Fitness" – February 7, 1993
 "Men on Film" – April 8, 1995. Saturday Night Live sketch featuring Chris Farley as Roger Ebert.

Reception and cultural impact
Fox was hesitant about the "Men on ..." sketches before the series premiere. According to series creator Keenen Ivory Wayans, the chairman of Fox sat down with him to try to persuade him to pull "Men on Films" from the premiere episode. Damon Wayans reported that after Fox moved In Living Color from its original 9:30 p.m. Eastern Time to 8:00 p.m., Fox censors began exercising more editorial control over the sketches. "David will say something to me [in a "Men on ..." sketch] and it will cut to me and I'm smiling. What I said was taken out. It happens a lot."

The "Men on ..." series was controversial within the LGBT community. At the time Blaine and Antoine were the only recurring gay characters on network television, also making them the only African American gay characters on the air. As evidenced by a 1992 survey by the San Francisco chapter of the Gay & Lesbian Alliance Against Defamation, opinion was split roughly down the middle on the sketches. Half of respondents found the sketches humorous while the other half found them offensive and dangerous. Gay African American filmmaker Marlon Riggs sharply criticized the sketches, saying that they perpetuated "a notion that black gay men are sissies, ineffectual, ineffective, womanish in a way that signifies inferiority".

In an appearance on The Phil Donahue Show following In Living Colors second season, Damon Wayans responded to critics of "Men on ..." by saying:
Well, first off, all the sketches on the show have to be looked at within the context of the show, and it's not as though we isolate any particular group. We make fun of everybody, and so I don't think anybody should have a chip on their shoulder—when it's a free-for-all. And the other thing, too, is, the sketch is not a bashing sketch. We don't do jokes about any issues related to gay people. It's really a play on the extremes of the stereotype, and that's it.

In 2021, Grier gave his thoughts on whether the sketch could be done today. He said:At the time, as far as I know, there were no out gay or trans/genderfluid cast members. There was nothing in that comedy which I felt was homophobic gay hatred. But I also am smart enough to know it’s not how your heart was behind the joke; it’s how that joke or that characterization lands with other people. So that was a long time ago. I don’t think we could do that now, which is fine. If Living Color were on now, I would hope that there would be more than one gay cast members in the show, and then they could tackle this humor using their voice.Author J. L. King, whose writings explore the down-low phenomenon within the African American male community, cited Blaine and Antoine, along with drag performer RuPaul, as images of what the word "gay" means to African American men who have sex with men to explain one reason why such men do not identify themselves as gay.

Cultural critic Angela Nelson places Blaine and Antoine in the context of what she identifies as the "sophisticated sissy" alongside characters like Lindy (Antonio Fargas) from the film Car Wash. These characters depict African American homosexual males as effeminate and/or cross dressers. The "sophisticated sissy" characterization frequently appears in dialogue between two (ostensibly heterosexual) black male characters, often in the context of one character accusing the other of being weak in his handling of women, and is often accompanied by a stereotypical limp wrist or hip swishing gesture.

See also 
 African-American culture and sexual orientation

References

Bibliography
 
 
 
 
 
 
 

Comedy sketches
Gay effeminacy
LGBT portrayals in mass media
LGBT African-American culture
Stereotypes of LGBT people